Rickey Young (born December 7, 1953) is a former American football running back who played nine seasons in the National Football League (NFL).

College career
Young played college football at Jackson State University and was a teammate of Walter Payton, his nephew, and Robert Brazile, his cousin.

NFL career
Young was selected in the seventh round of the 1975 NFL Draft with the 164th overall pick by the San Diego Chargers. After playing three years for the Chargers (1975–1977) he was traded to the Minnesota Vikings for All-Pro guard Ed White. In his first season with the Vikings (1978) he led the NFL with 88 receptions, breaking Chuck Foreman's record for receptions by a running back in a season. He played in six seasons with the Vikings, but retired after seeing limited action in 1982 and 1983. He retired with 1,011 rushes for 3,666 yards and 23 touchdowns, along with 408 catches (then an NFL record for running backs) for 3,285 and 16 touchdowns.

In his nine seasons in the NFL, Young did not miss a single game, playing in all 131 contests that his teams played in that span.

Personal life
Young has two children: Micah, born in 1985, who is affected by microcephaly, and Colby, born in 1988.

References

External links
 

1953 births
Living people
American football running backs
Jackson State Tigers football players
Minnesota Vikings players
San Diego Chargers players
Vigor High School alumni
Sportspeople from Mobile, Alabama
Players of American football from Alabama